Ian Fleming: Where Bond Began was a 2008 documentary presented by Joanna Lumley which explored the life of the author Ian Fleming and the origin of his character James Bond. It was first broadcast on BBC One at 6:10pm on Sunday 19 October 2008 and was commissioned to celebrate the 100th anniversary of Fleming's birth and the then forthcoming release of the film Quantum of Solace.

External links 

 

BBC television documentaries
2008 television specials
British television documentaries
Works about Ian Fleming